This is a list of Associate Justices of the Rhode Island Supreme Court from 1747 to the present. The Justices are listed under the term of the Chief Justice sitting at the time of their appointments (for a complete list of the Chief Justices, see List of Chief Justices of the Rhode Island Supreme Court).

May 1747 – May 1749 Gideon Cornell
Stephen Hopkins
Joshua Babcock
Josiah Arnold
John Howland

May 1749 – May 1751 Joshua Babcock
Jonathan Randall (May 1749 – May 1761)
William Hopkins (May 1749 – May 1750)
William Hall (May 1749 – May 1750)
John Walton (May 1749 – May 1751)
William Richmond (May 1750 – May 1751)
Benjamin Hazard (May 1750 – May 1751)

May 1751 – May 1755 Stephen Hopkins
Joseph Russell (May 1751 – May 1759; May 1761 – August 1763)
Joseph Clarke (May 1751 – May 1761)

May 1756 – May 1761 John Gardner
Joseph Lippitt (May 1759 – May 1761)

May 1761 – May 1762 Samuel Ward
Thomas Wickham (May 1761 – May 1762)
John Burton (May 1761 – May 1762)

May 1762 – August 1763 John Gardner
Nicholas Easton (May 1762 – August 1763)
Samuel Nightingale (May 1762 – August 1763; June 1767 – June 1769)

1762 – 1764 Jeremiah Niles, Joseph Russell, Joshua Babcock, John Banister
Thomas Cranston (August 1763 – May 1764)
John Cole (August 1763 – May 1765; Chief Justice February 1764 – May 1765)
Thomas Greene (August 1763 – May 1765 and June 1769 – June 1770)
Silas Niles (August 1763 – May 1765)

1764 – 1765 John Cole
Job Bennet Jr. (May 1764 – May 1768)
Stephen Potter (May 1764 – May 1765; May 1767 – May 1768; and May 1778 – 1780)

1765 – 1767 Joseph Russell, James Helme
William Hall (May 1749 – May 1750; May 1761 – August 1763; and May 1765 – June 1767)
Job Bennet Jr. (May 1764 – May 1768)
Gideon Comstock (May 1766 – June 1767; June 1769 – June 1770; and May 1779 – May 1781)
Benoni Hall (May 1765 – May 1768, and June 1769 – May 1773)
Henry Harris (May 1765 – May 1766)
Metcalf Bowler (May 1768 – June 1769; June 1770 – February 1777)
Nathaniel Searle (May 1768 – June 1770)

1770 – 1776 Stephen Hopkins, John Cooke
James Helme (June 1767 – May 1768 and June 1769 – May 1774)
William Greene (February 1777 – May 1778)
Joseph Russell (May 1751 – August 1763; May 1765 – May 1767; May 1768 – June 1769; and May 1774 – August 1776)

1776 – 1777 Metcalf Bowler
Shearjashub Bourn (August 1776 – May 1778)
Jabez Bowen (August 1776 – May 1778)
Thomas Wells (August 1776 – May 1780)

1777 – 1778 William Greene
Perez Richmond

1778 – 1781 Shearjashub Bourn
Paul Mumford
Christopher Lippitt

1781 – 1781 Paul Mumford
William Ellery (declined) 
Peter Phillips

1781 – 1785 Paul Mumford
Thomas Tillinghast
Pardon Gray
Ambrose Page (declined)
David Howell
Jonathan Jenckes
William West

1785 – 1786 William Ellery
Thomas Arnold
Joseph Hazard

1786 – 1788 Paul Mumford
Gilbert Devol
Walter Cooke

1788 – 1791 Othniel Gorton
Simeon Clarke Jr.
Daniel Owen
Sylvester Robinson
Ezekiel Gardner Jr.

1791 – 1795 Daniel Owen
Carder Hazard
William Taggart
Joshua Bicknall

1795 – 1809 Peleg Arnold, Thomas Arnold
Joseph Hoxsie
George Brown
Thomas Holden
John Allen
Joseph Reynolds
Henry Remington
William Marchant
William Anthony
Benjamin Johnson

1810 – 1812 Thomas Arnold, Peleg Arnold
Jeffrey Hazard
Joseph Cundall
Charles Brayton
Thomas Westcott

1819 – 1819 James Fenner
Isaac Wilbour
Daniel Champlin
John DeWolf
Thomas Buffum

1819 – 1827 Isaac Wilbour
Dutee Arnold
John DeWolf
Luke Drury
Wheeler Martin
Samuel Randall
Isaac Fiske
Nathan Brown
Samuel Eddy

1827 – 1835 Samuel Eddy
Job Durfee
Levi Haile
William R. Staples
George A. Brayton

1854 – 1856 William R. Staples
Alfred Bosworth
Sylvester G. Shearman

1856 – 1866 Samuel Ames
J. Russell Bullock
Thomas Durfee

1866 – 1868 Charles S. Bradley

1868 – 1875 George A. Brayton
Walter S. Burgess
Elisha R. Potter

1875 – 1891 Thomas Durfee
Charles Matteson
John H. Stiness
Pardon E. Tillinghast
George A. Wilbur

1891 – 1900 Charles Matteson
Horatio Rogers Jr.
William W. Douglas

1900 – 1903 John H. Stiness
Benjamin M. Bosworth
Edward C. Dubois
John Taggard Blodgett

1904 – 1905 Pardon E. Tillinghast
Clarke H. Johnson

1905 – 1908, William W. Douglas

1909 – 1913, Edward C. Dubois
Christopher F. Parkhurst
William H. Sweetland
Darius Baker

1913 – 1917, Clarke H. Johnson

1917 – 1920 Christopher F. Parkhurst
Charles F. Stearns

1920 – 1929 William A. Sweetland
Walter B. Vincent
Elmer J. Rathbun
John W. Sweeney (1920–1935)
Chester W. Barrows

1929 – 1935 Charles F. Stearns
J. Jerome Hahn
John S. Murdock

1935 – 1957 Edmund W. Flynn
William W. Moss
Antonio A. Capotosto (1935–1956)
Hugh B. Baker (–1956)
Francis Condon
Jeremiah E. O'Connell (–1956)

1958 – 1965, Francis Condon
Thomas H. Roberts (1956–1976)
Harold A. Andrews

1966 – 1976 Thomas H. Roberts
F. Frederick Frost
William E. Powers
Thomas J. Paolino
Alfred H. Joslin
John F. Doris
Thomas F. Kelleher

1976 – 1986 Joseph A. Bevilacqua Sr.
Joseph R. Weisberger
Florence K. Murray
Donald F. Shea

1986 – 1993 Thomas Fay

1993 – 2001 Joseph R. Weisberger
Maureen McKenna Goldberg
John P. Bourcier
Robert Flanders
Victoria Lederberg

2001 – 2008 Frank J. Williams
Paul Suttell
William P. Robinson III
Francis X. Flaherty

2009 – present Paul Suttell
Gilbert V. Indeglia
Erin Lynch Prata (2021–)
Melissa A. Long (2021–)

Bibliography 

The Supreme Court of Rhode Island (RI Supreme Court, 2010), pg. 23

See also
List of Chief Justices of the Rhode Island Supreme Court
Rhode Island Supreme Court

References

Pre-statehood history of Rhode Island
People of colonial Rhode Island
Rhode Island in the American Revolution
Chief Justices of the Rhode Island Supreme Court
Justices